Storådalshøi or Storådalshøe is a mountain in Lom Municipality in Innlandet county, Norway. The mountain is surrounded by several other notable mountains including Reinstinden and Raudhamran to the northeast, Høgtunga to the southeast, Semeltinden and Søre Hellstugutinden to the northwest, and Hinnotefjellet to the north.

See also
List of mountains of Norway by height

References

Jotunheimen
Lom, Norway
Mountains of Innlandet